This is a list of Registered Historic Places in Smithfield, Rhode Island.

|}

See also

National Register of Historic Places listings in Providence County, Rhode Island
List of National Historic Landmarks in Rhode Island

References

Smithfield, Rhode Island
.N
.
Smithfield
Smithfield, Rhode Island